The United States Space Forces Central (USSPACEFOR-CENT) is the United States Space Force component field command to the United States Central Command. Headquartered at MacDill Air Force Base, Florida, it plans, coordinates, supports, and conducts employment of space operations across the full range of military operations, including security cooperation, in support of the combatant command's objectives. It was activated on 2 December 2022.

History

Director of Space Forces, U.S. Air Forces Central 
USSPACEFORINDOPAC's presence in the United States Central Command traces back to the director of space forces (DIRSPACEFOR) construct before the establishment of the Space Force. When the Space Force was still Air Force Space Command, there would be a space operations officer called the DIRSPACEFOR in every air service component command that would advise the air component commander on matters relating to space operations. As such, there was a director of space forces assigned to United States Air Forces Central.

List of directors of space forces 

Assistant Combined Air Operations Center Director for Space and Information Warfare
 Brig Gen Richard E. Webber, October 2001 – March 2002
Directors of Space Forces

 Col Teresa A. H. Djuric, April 2004 – August 2004
 Col Michael Carey, October 2004 – March 2005
 Col Jack Weinstein, ~March 2005 – ~June 2005
 Col J. Kevin McLaughlin, October 2005 - February 2006
 Col Martin Whelan, January 2006 – June 2006
 Col John E. Hyten, May 2006 – October 2006
 Col John W. Raymond, September 2006 – January 2007
 Col Cary C. Chun, January 2007 – June 2007
 Col John Riordan, ~June 2007 – ~2008
 Col David D. Thompson, June 2009 – June 2010
 Col David J. Buck, May 2010 – May 2011
 Col Clinton Crosier, May 2011 – July 2012
 Col Keith W. Balts, May 2012 – May 2013
 Col Jennifer Moore, ~May 2013 – April 2014
 Col Douglas Schiess, April 2014 – April 2015
 Col Michael S. Hough, April 2015 – April 2016
 Col Michael Jackson, April 2016 – April 2017
 Col Jacob Middleton Jr., ~January 2019– ~23 September 2019
 Col Todd J. Benson, ~23 September 2019 – ~December 2020
 Col Robert J. Schreiner, December 2020 – June 2021
 Col Anthony Mastalir, July 2021 – April 2022
 Col Christopher S. Putnam, March 2022 – present

Establishment 
Initial plans for establishment of Space Force component field commands started in 2021 when then Colonel Anthony Mastalir was assigned as director of space forces at the Ninth Air Force and stand up the USSPACEFORCENT. USSPACEFORCENT was supposed to be the first Space Force component field command. In November 2021, Secretary Frank Kendall III approved the creation of Space Force elements in U.S. European Command, U.S. Central Command, and U.S. Indo-Pacific Command, but establishing those elements as component commands required Joint Chiefs of Staff approval.

By May 2022, plans were changed to first establish the United States Space Forces Indo-Pacific (USSPACEFORINDOPAC) because China being the pacing threat. Mastalir then returned to Vandenberg and was replaced by Colonel Christopher S. Putnam as director of space forces. On 22 November 2022, USSPACEFORINDOPAC was established and Mastalir took the helm as its first commander.

Prior to the establishment of USSPACEFORINDOPAC, General David D. Thompson announced that the USSPACEFORCENT would be established shortly after the establishment of USSPACEFORINDOPAC. On 2 December 2022, USSPACEFORCENT was established. It is initially composed of 28 personnel and Putnam serves as its first commander.

Heraldry

Emblem 
The USSPACEFORCENT emblem has for elements:
 The four-pointed Polaris taken from the Space Force seal symbolizes the Guardian Commitment and the service's four values: character, connection, commitment, and courage.
 The astrolabe, an early scientific instrument prominent in Middle Eastern antiquity, represents "terrestrial forces' critical dependence on space capabilities and pays homage to the use of the space-based Global Positioning System during Operation Desert Storm in the Gulf War.
 The broadsword, an element taken from the U.S. Central Command emblem, represents USSPACEFORCENT's readiness to fight as "Guardians of CENTCOM".

List of commanders

See also 

 United States Central Command
 United States Space Force
 Ninth Air Force

References 

United States Space Force
United States Space Force personnel